The Hour of Slack is a one-hour radio program produced by the Church of the SubGenius centering on the King of Slack, J. R. "Bob" Dobbs.  Reverend Ivan Stang presents his own commentary, along with recorded material from all SubGenius radio and stage shows, bands, ranters, media barrage collage artists, and selections from the indie audio underground created by various SubGenii and others. Over 1,700 segments of this show have been broadcast. It is syndicated across North America, and weekly shows (and past segments) are available by mail. Originally created in Dallas, TX, the show now originates either in pre-recorded form from the Church of the SubGenius headquarters in Cleveland Heights, OH, or occasionally performed live at WCSB-FM (both for broadcast and live MP3 stream) on the campus of Cleveland State University. The show is also available as a podcast in iTunes

Stations that carry Hour of Slack

 ALASKA - Kasilof: KWMD 90.7 FM
 ALASKA - Anchorage: KWMD 104.5 FM
 ARKANSAS - Fayetteville: KXUA 88.3 FM
 CALIFORNIA - Santa Cruz: Free Radio Santa Cruz 101.1 FM
 COLORADO - Boulder: KFBR 95.3 FM
 CONNECTICUT - New London: WCNI 90.9 FM (intermittently)
 CONNECTICUT - Storrs: WHUS 91.7 FM
 FLORIDA - Dade City: Dade City Community Radio 87.9 FM
 GEORGIA - Atlanta: WREK 91.1 FM Georgia Tech (also Rev. Susie's "Bob's Slacktime Funhouse" afterwards)
 IDAHO - Moscow: KRFP 92.5 FM
 ILLINOIS - Champaign: WEFT 90.1 FM (part of The Mental Vortex)
 INDIANA - 
 MAINE - Portland: WMPG 90.9 FM
 MINNESOTA - Minneapolis: Radio Free Twin Cities 93.1 FM
 N. CAROLINA - Greensboro: WQFS 90.9 FM
 N. CAROLINA - Durham: WXDU 88.7 FM
 OHIO - Cleveland: WCSB 89.3 FM (flagship station)
 OHIO - Kingsville: Edge Radio 106.7 FM
 PENNSYLVANIA - Stroudsburg: WFZR 89.1 FM
 TENNESSEE - Sewanee: WUTS 91.3 FM
 TENNESSEE - Knoxville: WOZO-LP 103.9 FM
 TEXAS - Austin: KAOS 95.9 FM
 WISCONSIN - Madison: WORT 89.9 FM
 WISCONSIN - Milwaukee: WICA 92.9 FM
 CANADA - Halifax: CKDU-FM 88.1 FM
 CANADA - Vancouver, BC: CJSF-FM 90.1 FM and 93.3 cable FM
 CANADA - Victoria: CFUV-FM 101.9 FM
 Shortwave - WBCQ 'The Planet', 7.415 MHz shortwave (also on freq. 9.330, 17.495 and 5.110 MHz)

External links
Hour of Slack official website at SubGenius.com - includes broadcast times, downloads.

Church of the SubGenius
American comedy radio programs